Philip Dean Miller (born ) is an American politician. He was elected to the Iowa House of Representatives in a special election following the death of Curt Hanson to represent the 82nd district as a member of the Democratic Party. He is a veterinarian with a degree from Iowa State University as well as a member of the Fairfield School Board.

References

Living people
1950s births
Members of the Iowa House of Representatives
Iowa State University alumni